Shahid Zaman Khan (born August 12, 1982) is a Pakistani professional squash player. He is a nephew of the 1975 World squash champion, Qamar Zaman, the famous master of the drop shots and deception.

In 2004, he won his first title at the Pakistan circuit in Event I. In 2005, he won the Virginia Professional Squash championship and went on to win the COAS international 2005 and the Pakistan circuit 2005 - Event II.

He is now working as a head squash professional in the Tennis and Racquet Club, the oldest athletic and social club in the city of Boston.

External links
 

Pakistani male squash players
Pashtun people
People from Quetta
1982 births
Living people
Squash players at the 2002 Asian Games
Medalists at the 2002 Asian Games
Asian Games bronze medalists for Pakistan
Asian Games medalists in squash
21st-century Pakistani people